Lacera is a genus of moths of the family Erebidae first described by Achille Guenée in 1852.

Description
Palpi with second joint reaching vertex of head and short third joint. Antennae of male minutely ciliated. Thorax and abdomen clothed with coarse hairy. Tibia very heavily tufted with hair. Forewings with arched apex and somewhat acute. The outer margin angled at center. Cilia crenulate. Hindwings with crenulate cilia. Margin produced to slight points at veins 4 and 6. Larva with four pairs of abdominal prolegs, where the first two pairs are aborted.

Species
 Lacera alope Cramer, [1780]
 Lacera apicirupta Carcasson, 1965
 Lacera asinuosa Holloway, 1979
 Lacera azatothi Zilli & Hogenes, in lit
 Lacera contrasta Holloway, 1979
 Lacera nyarlathotepi Zilli & Holloway, in lit
 Lacera noctilio Fabricius, 1794
 Lacera procellosa Butler, 1879
 Lacera uniformis Holloway, 1979
 Lacera vinacea Holloway, 1979
 Lacera violacea Holloway, 1979

Former species
 Lacera capella Guenée, 1852
 Lacera sublineata Walker, 1865 (Daddala)

References

External links

 
 

 
Hulodini
Moth genera